The 2002–03 Maltese Second Division started on 28 September 2002 and finished on 18 May 2003.

Participating teams
 Attard
 Dingli
 Gzira
 Luqa
 Mellieha
 Qormi
 San Gwann
 St. Andrews
 Tarxien
 Vittoriosa
 Zebbug
 Zurrieq

Changes from previous season
Promoted from Maltese Third Division
 San Gwann F.C.
 Vittoriosa Stars F.C.

Relegated from 2001–02 Maltese First Division
 Qormi F.C.
 St. Andrews F.C.

Final standings

Promotion play-off

|}

San Gwann promoted to Maltese First Division

Top scorers

External links
 Complete set of results at maltafootball.com

Maltese Second Division seasons
Malta
3